Julia Wong (born 25 July 1975) is a Canadian former field hockey player.

References

1975 births
Living people
Canadian female field hockey players
Pan American Games competitors for Canada
Field hockey players at the 1999 Pan American Games
Field hockey players at the 1998 Commonwealth Games
Commonwealth Games competitors for Canada